Anseongella ginsenosidimutans  is a Gram-negative, rod-shaped and non-spore-forming bacterium from the genus of Anseongella which has been isolated from soil from a ginseng field in Pocheon in Korea.

References

External links
Type strain of Anseongella ginsenosidimutans at BacDive -  the Bacterial Diversity Metadatabase

Sphingobacteriia
Bacteria described in 2016